Julie Morgenstern is an American author, speaker and consultant. Her first book, Organizing from the Inside Out, was a New York Times bestseller.

Career
She is also the author of Time Management from the Inside Out, Organizing from the Inside Out for Teens, Never Check Email in the Morning and Shed Your Stuff, Change Your Life. Her most recent book, Time to Parent: Organizing Your Life to Bring Out the Best in Your Child and You, released on September 4, 2018 by Henry Holt, a subsidiary of MacMillan Publishers, includes research, strategies and tips to help parents balance raising a child and living a fulfilling, adult life.

She has been interviewed on TV and radio outlets, including The Today Show, CNN, The Oprah Winfrey Show, CBS, Wendy Williams and Fox News. She has been quoted and featured in magazines and newspapers, including Forbes, Harvard Business Review, Cosmopolitan, The New York Times, Self, Time, Men's Health, Real Simple, Psychology Today, and Refinery 29

References 

Living people
21st-century American women writers
American consultants
Year of birth missing (living people)
Writers from Philadelphia